Jack Walker (1882–1960) was an English footballer who played in the Football League for Wolverhampton Wanderers.

Career
Walker played for a series of local non-league clubs before earning a move to Football League side Wolverhampton Wanderers in August 1903. He made his Football League on 14 November 1903 in a 0–2 defeat at Aston Villa. He made only one further first team appearance for the club, in a goalless draw at Stoke on 4 April 1904.

References
 

1882 births
1960 deaths
People from Gornal, West Midlands
English footballers
English Football League players
Wolverhampton Wanderers F.C. players
Association football midfielders